Cape Ray is a headland located at the southwestern extremity of the island of Newfoundland in the Canadian province of Newfoundland and Labrador.

It is the site of the Cape Ray Lighthouse.
It is located opposite Cape North on Cape Breton Island, Nova Scotia. Cape Ray the community takes its name from this historic landmark.

See also
List of lighthouses in Canada

References

External links
 Cape Ray Lighthouse
 Aids to Navigation Canadian Coast Guard

Ray
Lighthouses in Newfoundland and Labrador